Express Island is a narrow and craggy island,  long, lying close offshore of northwest Greenwich Island in the South Shetland Islands, Antarctica. It is situated due north of Greaves Peak, forming most of the east side of Razlog Cove. Surface area .

It was named by the UK Antarctic Place-Names Committee in 1977 after the American schooner Express (Capt. Ephraim Williams), one of the ships in the sealing fleet of Edmund Fanning and Benjamin Pendleton from Stonington, Connecticut, which operated in this area, 1820–21.

See also 
 Composite Gazetteer of Antarctica
 Greenwich Island (South Shetland Islands)
 List of Antarctic islands south of 60° S
 Scientific Committee on Antarctic Research
 Territorial claims in Antarctica

Map
 L.L. Ivanov et al. Antarctica: Livingston Island and Greenwich Island, South Shetland Islands. Scale 1:100000 topographic map. Sofia: Antarctic Place-names Commission of Bulgaria, 2005.

References

External links
 SCAR Composite Antarctic Gazetteer.

Islands of the South Shetland Islands